Purbichauki is a Gaupalika in Doti District in the Sudurpashchim Province of far-western Nepal. 
Purbichauki has a population of 22483.The land area is 117.66 km2.

Demographics
At the time of the 2011 Nepal census, Purbichauki Rural Municipality had a population of 22,489. Of these, 99.0% spoke Doteli, 0.7% Nepali, 0.1% Achhami, 0.1% Maithili and 0.1% other languages as their first language.

In terms of ethnicity/caste, 69.2% were Chhetri, 11.1% Kami, 6.9% other Dalit, 4.5% Damai/Dholi, 3.1% Badi, 1.9% Hill Brahmin, 1.5% Lohar, 0.6% Newar, 0.3% Sanyasi/Dasnami, 0.2% Terai Brahmin, 0.2% Magar, 0.1% other Terai, 0.1% Chamar/Harijan/Ram and 0.3% others.

In terms of religion, 99.9% were Hindu.

References

Rural municipalities in Doti District
Rural municipalities of Nepal established in 2017